Daniel Luke Ingram (born June 13, 1975) is a Canadian composer and lyricist, primarily for animated series soundtracks. He has written more than 200 songs for television, in genres ranging from pop and classic rock to large-scale Broadway-style musical theater. His music has been heard in 180 countries. He is mostly known for his work as the songwriter of My Little Pony: Friendship Is Magic and the films based on the series. He has written over 80 songs for My Little Pony since 2010.

Ingram has received several awards for his music. Between 2012 and 2017, he has been nominated for five Daytime Emmy Awards for Outstanding Original Song in a Children's or Animated Series. "Becoming Popular (The Pony Every Pony Should Know)" and "May The Best Pet Win" from My Little Pony: Friendship Is Magic were nominated in 2012, while "The Magic Inside" and "Legend of Everfree" were nominated in 2016 and 2017 and "If You're A Guy" from Littlest Pet Shop was nominated in 2013. He received a 2010 Leo Award for Best Music in an Animated Series for Martha Speaks, and the 2008 Leo Award for Best Music in a Variety Television Show for About a Girl.

On October 18, 2012, Hub Network (now known as Discovery Family) officially announced that Ingram will be performing double duties as songwriter for the third season of My Little Pony: Friendship Is Magic and the new series Littlest Pet Shop. In 2013, he received a Leo Award for Best Musical Score in an Animation along with Steffan Andrews for his work in the Friendship Is Magic episode "Magical Mystery Cure". He has also been featured in Rolling Stone for his work on My Little Pony. Ingram described both Alan Menken and Randy Newman as an influence on his work.

Filmography

Web production
 #TweetIt: Featuring My Little Pony Staff and Bronies - Himself
 Rainbow Rocks: Music to My Ears - Animated Short (Composer)
 Rainbow Rocks: Shake Your Tail - Animated Short / Music Video (Composer)
 Rainbow Rocks: Perfect Day for Fun - Animated Short / Music Video (Composer/Writer)
 Rainbow Rocks: Friendship Through the Ages - Animated Short / Music Video (Composer/Writer)
 Rainbow Rocks: Life is a Runway - Animated Short / Music Video (Composer/Writer)
 Rainbow Rocks: My Past is Not Today - Animated Short / Music Video (Composer/Writer)
 Summertime Short: Good Vibes - Animated Short / Music Video (Composer/Writer)

Television scores
 Martha Speaks, Seasons 1 - 4 (Composer)
 Pound Puppies, Seasons 1 & 2 (Composer and infrequent Songwriter)
 The Adventures of Chuck and Friends, Seasons 1 & 2 (Songwriter)
 My Little Pony: Equestria Girls – Dance Magic - (Songwriter)
 My Little Pony: Friendship Is Magic, Seasons 1 - 9 (Songwriter, Composer)
 Littlest Pet Shop, (Composer, Songwriter)
 On Screen!, Seasons 1 - 3 (Composer)
 The Math Show (Composer)
 Leroy Dorsalfin (Composer)
 About a Girl, Season 1 (Composer)
 Ricky Sprocket, Season 1 (Additional Music)
 Empty Arms (Composer)
 The Older I Get the Wiser I Get (Composer)
 A Daughter's Conviction (Additional Music)
 Imaginary Playmate (Additional Music)
 Last Chance Café (Additional Music)
 Pucca, Season 1 (Additional Music)
 EARTH = home (Additional Music)
 Children of Tsunami: No More Tears (Composer)
 Return of the Tall Ships (Composer)
 Nobody TV movie (Additional Music)

Film scores
 My Little Pony: The Movie (Composer/Songwriter)
 My Little Pony: Equestria Girls (Songwriter)
 My Little Pony: Equestria Girls – Rainbow Rocks (Songwriter)
 My Little Pony: Equestria Girls – Friendship Games (Songwriter)
 My Little Pony: Equestria Girls – Legend of Everfree (Songwriter)
 Love Notes TV movie (Composer)
 To Be Fat Like Me TV movie (Additional Music)
 Kung Fu Magoo (Composer)

Video games
 Billie Bust Up (Composer)

Voice acting
 My Little Pony: Friendship Is Magic - Tourist Pony 2 (episode: "Rarity Takes Manehattan") (uncredited cameo)

Music supervision and editing
 The Week the Women Went, Season 2
 Combat School, Season 1
 Ricky Sprocket, Season 1
 Crash Test Mommy, Seasons 2 - 4
 Pucca, Season 1
 Stunt Dawgs, Season 1
 The Stagers, Seasons 1 - 2
 Second Sight, TV movie

Awards and nominations
 2008 Leo Award for Best Musical Score in a Music, Comedy, or Variety Program or Series (About a Girl, winner)
 2009 Leo Award for Best Musical Score in an Animation Program or Series (Martha Speaks, nominee)
 2010 Leo Award for Best Musical Score in an Animation Program or Series (Martha Speaks, winner)
 2012 Daytime Emmy Award for Outstanding Original Song in a Children's or Animated Series ("May The Best Pet Win" - My Little Pony: Friendship Is Magic, nominee)
 2012 Daytime Emmy Award for Outstanding Original Song in a Children's or Animated Series ("Becoming Popular (The Pony Every Pony Should Know)" - My Little Pony: Friendship is Magic, nominee)
 2013 Leo Award for Best Musical Score in an Animation Program or Series ("Magical Mystery Cure" - My Little Pony: Friendship Is Magic, winner)
 2013 Daytime Emmy Award for Outstanding Original Song in a Children's or Animated Series ("If You're A Guy" - Littlest Pet Shop, nominee)
 2014 Leo Award for Best Musical Score in an Animation Program or Series ("Pinkie Pride" - My Little Pony: Friendship Is Magic, nominee)
 2016 Daytime Emmy Award for Outstanding Original Song in a Non-Drama Series ("The Magic Inside" - My Little Pony: Friendship Is Magic, nominee)
 2016 Leo Award for Best Musical Score in an Animation Program or Series ("Nina's Birthday" - Nina's World with Caleb Chan, nominee)
 2016 Leo Award for Best Musical Score in an Animation Program or Series ("Crusaders of the Lost Mark" - My Little Pony: Friendship Is Magic, winner)
 2017 Leo Award for Best Musical Score in an Animation Program or Series ("A Hearth's Warming Tail" - My Little Pony: Friendship Is Magic with Caleb Chan, nominee)
 2017 Daytime Emmy Award for Outstanding Original Song in a Non-Drama Series ("Legend of Everfree" - My Little Pony: Equestria Girls – Legend of Everfree, nominee)

Notes

References

External links
 
 Interview on Equestria Daily
 Interview on Studio 4 with Host Fanny Kiefer
 Interview on The Express,Vancouver May 25, 2011
 Interview on 918TheFan

1975 births
Animation composers
Canadian film score composers
Canadian male voice actors
Male film score composers
Canadian television composers
Musicians from Vancouver
My Little Pony: Friendship Is Magic
Living people